The British Library of Political and Economic Science, commonly referred to as "LSE Library", is the main library of the London School of Economics and Political Science (LSE). It is one of the largest libraries in the world devoted to the economic and social sciences. The Library responds to around 6,500 visits from students and staff each day. In addition, it provides a specialist international research collection, serving over 12,000 registered external users each year. It is housed in the Lionel Robbins Building.

Location
The library is located on the London School of Economics (LSE) Campus, near Portugal Street. The current building is the former headquarters and warehouse facilities of WH Smith, opened in 1916 and taken over by LSE in 1976, to be reopened as a library in 1978.

History
The Library was founded in 1896, one year after the LSE. It was founded in order to "provide, for the serious student of administrative and constitutional problems, what has hitherto been lacking in this country, namely a collection of the materials for economic and political research". A history of its development and collections is available on its institutional repository, LSE Research Online.

Collections 
Since its foundation the library has been the national social sciences library of the United Kingdom, and collects material on a worldwide basis in all major European languages. Over 50 km of shelving, enough to stretch the length of the Channel Tunnel, houses over four and a half million items including 31,000 past and present journal titles. The Library subscribes to approximately 15,000 e-journals as part of its electronic information provision. It has been designated as a United Nations depository library, providing a comprehensive collection of UN publications and documents. Many other organisations are also represented, including OECD (Organisation for Economic Co-operation and Development), ILO (International Labour Organization), OAS (Organization of American States) and GATT/WTO (General Agreement on Tariffs and Trade / World Trade Organization). It is also a European Documentation Centre and has received publications from the European Community since 1964. Its collections have been recognised for their national and international importance and awarded 'Designation' status by the Museums, Libraries and Archives Council (MLA).

The library's archives hold a number of unique collections. These include Charles Booth's poverty maps, which were awarded UNESCO status in 2016 on the Memory of the World Register. It also holds a number of other archive collections of national or international significance, such as The Women's Library, LGBT activism, British politics and early left wing thought, and peace campaigning.

The Library has a number of open access platforms to make its collections available freely online. These include a digital library which holds digitised items from its collections, LSE Theses Online, which holds PhDs recently completed or digitised at the LSE, and LSE Research Online, which holds research outputs by LSE academic staff. LSE Press was launched in 2018 and publishes peer-reviewed open access research in the social sciences through books and journals (LSE Public Policy Review, Journal of Illicit Economies and Development, and Journal of Long-Term Care). Student work is published through the Houghton Street Press imprint. The Library holds a free exhibition space which showcases some of its unique collections, with three termly exhibitions each year.

Redevelopment

The library underwent a £35 million building redevelopment in 2000, overseen by Foster and Partners. The building was officially reopened on 27 November 2001 by The Princess Royal and was commended in the 2002 Civic Trust Awards, given to outstanding examples of architecture and environmental design in major city areas of the UK, taking into account the benefit each project brings to its local area as well as the quality of its design. A further redevelopment in summer 2007, saw the expansion of the Course Collection by 60%, a new help desk, more study spaces and an increase in self-service facilities.

The Lionel Robbins Building covers 20,000 square metres, and offers 1,700 study places, including 450 networked PCs and 226 laptop drop-in points. A light-filled atrium, named after Michael Peacock and spiral stepped ramp culminate at the top in a partially glazed dome which has been precisely angled to maximise daylight with minimal solar glare. A reflecting panel on the roof also helps to direct sunlight to the floors below. The dome and other windows respond automatically according to the temperature in the building; ventilating it naturally.

See also
 Women's Library
 Shaw Library

References

External links

British Library of Political and Economic Science
Collection highlights
The LSE Digital Library
Charles Booth Online Archive
LSE Library Catalogue
LSE Press
Houghton Street Press

Commercial buildings completed in 1916
London School of Economics
Academic libraries in London
Research libraries in the United Kingdom
Libraries in the City of Westminster
Economics libraries
1896 establishments in the United Kingdom
Libraries established in 1896
Neo-futurism architecture